Hausner is a surname. Notable people with the surname include:

Bernard Hausner (1874–1938), Polish rabbi, politician, and diplomat
Gideon Hausner (1915–1990), Israeli jurist and politician
Jerzy Hausner (born 1949), Polish politician and economist
Jessica Hausner (born 1972), Austrian film director and screenwriter
Krzysztof Hausner (born 1944), Polish football right-wing forward
Rudolf Hausner (1914–1995), Austrian painter, draughtsman, printmaker and sculptor
Siegfried Hausner (1952–1975), student member of the German Socialist Patients' Collective and later the Red Army Faction

See also
Hausner ratio, number that is correlated to the flowability of a powder or granular material